Rachel Blanchard (born 19 March 1976) is a Canadian actress. Her television work includes playing Cher in American sitcom Clueless, Nancy in British sitcom Peep Show, Emma in American comedy-drama series You Me Her, and most recently, Susannah in American romantic drama series The Summer I Turned Pretty.

Career
Blanchard's career was launched with a part in a McDonald's commercial, and as an eight-year-old on the Canadian children's show The Kids of Degrassi Street, in which she played Melanie Schlegel. She also starred in the television series War of the Worlds as Suzanne McCullough's daughter Debi and in YTV's Are You Afraid of the Dark? as Kristen. Blanchard played the part of Cher Horowitz (originally portrayed by Alicia Silverstone in the film version) in the television series Clueless (based on the 1995 movie of the same name). She played Roxanne on the television series 7th Heaven from 2002 to 2004.

Blanchard appeared as Nancy, the American girlfriend of main character Jeremy Usborne (Robert Webb), in the second series of British sitcom Peep Show. She reprised this role in the fourth series (2007). She played Sally on the HBO show Flight of the Conchords and had a recurring role in the first season of the 2014 FX crime series Fargo. From 2016-2020, Blanchard played Emma Trakarsky in comedy-drama You Me Her, a woman who enters into a polyamorous relationship with her husband and a younger woman.

She won the Gemini Award for Best Supporting Actress in a Comedy Series at the 26th Gemini Awards for her appearance on Call Me Fitz.

Filmography

Film

Television

Music videos

References

External links

1976 births
Living people
20th-century Canadian actresses
21st-century Canadian actresses
Actresses from Toronto
Best Supporting Actress in a Comedy Series Canadian Screen Award winners
Canadian child actresses
Canadian film actresses
Canadian television actresses
Queen's University at Kingston alumni
Havergal College alumni